Taiwan-Slovakia relations refers to bilateral ties between Taiwan (formally known as the Republic of China) and Slovakia (formally known as the Slovak Republic).

Overview 
Slovakian interests in Taiwan are represented by the Slovak Economic and Cultural Office Taipei. 

Slovakia does not extend diplomatic recognition to Taiwan although it is exploring ways to do so.

History 
The Slovak Economic and Cultural Office Taipei was opened in 2001.

Martin Podstavek assumed the role of Slovakian representative in Taiwan in 2017. In 2022, Podstavek was awarded the Taiwanese Grand Medal of Diplomacy.

In 2021, the Foreign Affairs Committee of the National Council of Slovakia passed a resolution to support the attendance of Taiwan at the World Health Assembly.

Trade 
During the early part of the COVID-19 pandemic, Taiwan donated masks to Slovakia. Later in the pandemic, Slovakia reciprocated with COVID vaccines.

Taiwan and Slovakia held trade talks in 2021.

References 

Foreign relations of Slovakia
Foreign relations of Taiwan